Mohammedia, known until 1960 as Fedala, is a port city on the west coast of Morocco between Casablanca and Rabat in the region of Casablanca-Settat. It hosts the most important oil refinery of Morocco, the Samir refinery, which makes it the center of the Moroccan petroleum industry. It has a population of 208,612 according to the 2014 Moroccan census.

History

Early history

The harbor, at what is now Mohammédia, was originally named Fédala. This name comes from the Arabic words Fadl Allah which means "favor of God". Traces still exist of its business role under the Almoravid dynasty. It was frequented in the 14th and 15th centuries by merchant ships from Europe seeking cereals and dried fruits.

In 1773, the Sultan Sidi Mohammed ben Abdallah made of Fédala a grains warehouse of Tamasna province and built the Kasbah to protect the shops for traders. He built the white masjid Al Atik as well.

French Protectorate

During the precolonial period, competition between the Western powers to ensure the economical exploitation of Africa was behind the merger of Europeans interests in the ports of Morocco. In the region of Fédala, the German family Mannesmann acquired a large area of land.

The Treaty of November 4, 1911 between France and Germany on the partition of Africa forced the Mannesmann family to abandon the lands they held for Georges and Jacques Hersent, two French industrialists, who noticed the existence of a natural bay, valuable for the creation of a large port at low cost.

The group Hersent created the Franco-Moroccan company in 1912 and founded the port company in 1914 that took a leading part in the development of Fédala. The rapid growth of the city started around the port, which allowed the development of various industries such as canning fishery products, agro-industry plants, tannery, textile, etc..

The seaside town took shape in 1925 and the Esplanade was built in 1938. The construction of the sea line in 1951 made of Fédala the first and most modern oil port in North Africa.

The church of Saint James (Saint Jacques), which overlooks the main square, was erected in 1934 by Jean and Georges Hersent, in memory of their son and nephew Jacques (3 February 1893 - 26 July 1917), who died at the Marne during the First World War. The town also has a school "Jacques Hersent", founded in 1929 by Georges Hersent, which claims to be named after his son Jacques who was drowned in Mohammedia.

Battle of Fedala
US Army invaded Fédala from the Atlantic on November 8, 1942 as part of operation Torch. The invasion was carried out by the Center Attack Group of the Western Task Force which landed on the Atlantic coast of Morocco. The landing began on 4 AM.

New city

Fédala was renamed Mohammedia on 25 June 1960 in honor of King Mohammed V, the restorer of Moroccan independence, on the occasion of laying the foundation stone of the Samir oil refinery. The new name indicates the modern character of this city. Today, the city serves as both a seaside resort and a manufacturing center.

Mohammedia is also a resort city containing a golf and tennis club, casino and many other activities. In addition, people call it  which means "city of flowers and sports".

Within the past decade, Mohammedia's beaches "Sablet & Mimosa" have drawn many people from Casablanca, and its nearby cities.  Sablet and Mimosa have been under development, building new beach condos, villas, as well as more investments in small businesses which creates more jobs. Summer is simply the best season in Mohammedia being that there is more involvement due to an increase of the population. There is a wide range of outdoor activities including basketball, soccer, surfing, and fishing. The night life is a great experience to be part of, including several cafes, restaurants, clubs, and a boardwalk. A couple of beach residential areas that are good place for vacation are "Residence of Oubaha" and "Palm Beach." There are several other projects going on in the city of Mohammedia as well as infrastructure throughout the city.

On 22 December 2022, A huge explosion erupted after a gas storage facility went up in flames, authorities claimed to have no casualties, families and citizens living near the facility have evacuated the surroundings. After 2 hours of the incident, Local authorities contained the fires caused by the explosion.

Geography

Location 
It is located between the outlets of the rivers Oued El-Maleh and Oued Nfifikh and is bordered by the Atlantic Ocean to the north, Ben Slimane Province to the east and south, and the prefecture of Sidi Bernoussi-Zenata to the west.

Climate
Mohammédia has a hot-summer Mediterranean climate (Köppen climate classification Csa). The moderating effect of the Atlantic Ocean influences strongly on the city climate and makes its winter soft and warm, and its summer hot and cool. Mohammédia enjoys plenty of sunshine throughout the year with measurable precipitation annually.

Most rainfall occurs from November to April, and the average annual precipitation is around 432 mm. Precipitation is most commonly in the form of light rain showers, but sometimes there is heavy rainfall and thunderstorms.

Subdivisions
The province is divided administratively into the following:

Demographics
The population of Mohammédia is growing at a fast rate. The city, which had a population of only 500 people in 1914, is currently home to about 204,000 people.
All population groups of the Moroccan Kingdom are represented in this region. The first inhabitants of the city were the Zenata tribes, of which only few remain, divided territorially between Mohammédia and neighboring prefectures. Another Arab tribe of Mauritania, called Mjedba, settled between Fédala and Mediouna three centuries ago and are now twice as many as Zenata.

Sources : World Gazetter.

Education

The city has a French international school, Groupe Scolaire Claude Monet, serving moyenne section through collège (junior high school).

Municipality
Mohammedia, whose size has increased significantly during the second half of the 20th century, is becoming one of the biggest cities in Morocco. New neighborhoods are built in all the parts of the city and more people live in town.

The city is divided into 3 major distinct areas, the Kasbah area, the Al-Alia district, and the eastern coast.

Kasbah area

This area where stands the Kasbah extends from Souss Street to the Al-Wafaa subdivision. It represents the historical heart of the city and has marked a transitional compromise between an urbanism of modern buildings and monuments, and the forms of ancient old Medina. Many commercials and services exist along the narrow streets of the Kasbah and the boulevards of the surrounding area, such as clothing merchants, wool merchants and fruit sellers. This area, which represents the city center, hosts many administrations, mosques, restaurants, hotels and parks as well.
 Subdivisions: The Kasbah, Al-Wafaa, Al-Marsa, Dyour Al-Qraii.
 Famous places: Twin Towns Park, Mohamed V boulevard, the Corniche.
 Infrastructures and mobility : The railway station, Moulay Abdellah Hospital, the Prefecture, Bachir Stadium.

Al-Alia

This district is located southern in the city on a gentle hill slope, which gives it the name Al-Alia that means the upper side. It was built in 1948 as a solution to the shantytowns problem, where rural population were living, attracted by the industrial development of the city and looking for a job.

Today, the district equals a small city in continuous expansion, equipped by all necessary facilities.
 Ancient subdivisions: El Hassania, Derb Marrakech, Diour Doukkala, Derb Jamila, Derb Ourida, Derb Fath, Derb Douchmane, Riyad Salam, Derb Laâyoune, Hay Al-Houria.
 New subdivisions : Hay El-Falah, Anfa, Rachidia, Hay Reda, Hay Nasr, Hay el-Fajr, La Colline, Hay Al-Wahda.
 Infrastructures and mobility: The Municipal Theater, the Coach Station.

Eastern coast
The east side of the city is famous for its beaches, where the inhabitants of Mohammedia, Casablanca and the surrounding towns go swimming. Almost all of the area is a villa zone. However, many buildings have spring up on the seafront over the last 10 years, including an increasing number of luxury apartments.

Most of the faculties of Mohammedia are located in this side of town as well as a Marjane Hypermarket and a McDonald's restaurant.
 Beaches: Santa Monica, Les sablettes, Mannesman, La Siesta.
 Subdivisions: Soleil, Nice, Yasmina, Al-Asil.

Economics and transport

Port
The port of Mohammedia specialises in liquid bulk and petro-chemicals.

Notable People
Abderrahim Achchakir, International footballer 
Abraham Serfaty, Moroccan political activist.
Eric Besson, French politician.
Ahmed Faras, Former international  Moroccan football footballer.
Noureddine Ziyati, Moroccan footballer.
Tarik El Jarmouni, Moroccan football goalkeeper.
Reda El Amrani, Moroccan tennis player.
Jannat Mahid, Moroccan singer.
Mohamed Al Hachdadi, international volleyball player.
 Marwane Saâdane, Moroccan footballer.
 Abdelatif Noussir, moroccan footballer
Noureddine Kacemi, Former international footballer 
 Hassan Amcharrat, Former international footballer.
 Tarik El Jarmouni, Former international goalkeeper.
 Rachid Rokki, Former international footballer.

International relations

Twin towns - Sister cities
Mohammedia is twinned with:

References

 
Prefecturial capitals in Morocco
Municipalities of Morocco
Port cities and towns on the Moroccan Atlantic Coast
Ports and harbours of Morocco